Puri (Sl. No.: 107) is a Vidhan Sabha constituency of Puri district, Odisha.

This constituency includes Puri, 15 Gram panchayats (Birapratappur, Balipada, Jamarsuan, Baliput, Raigoroda, Garhmrugasira, Chalisbatia, Malatipatpur, Chandanpur, Sasandamodarpur, Samanga,  Gopinathpur, Harekrushnapur, Baliguali and Talajanga) of Puri sadar block and three GPs (Itibhuan, Garhbhingura and Chhaitana) of Gop block.

Elected members

Sixteen elections were held between 1951 and 2014 including one by election in 1991.
Elected members from the Puri constituency are:
2019: (107): Jayanta Kumar Sarangi (BJP)
2014: (107): Maheswar Mohanty (BJD)
2009: (107): Maheswar Mohanty (BJD)
2004: (56): Maheswar Mohanty (BJD)
2000: (56): Maheswar Mohanty (BJD)
1995: (56): Maheswar Mohanty (Janata Dal)
1991: (By Poll): Uma Ballav Rath (Janata Dal)
1990: (56): Braja Kishore Tripathy (Janata Dal)
1985: (56): Braja Kishore Tripathy  (Janata Party)
1980: (56): Gadadhar Mishra (Congress-I)
1977: (56): Braja Kishore Tripathy (Janata Party)
1974: (56): Brajamohan Mohanty (Congress)
1971: (52): Brajamohan Mohanty (Congress)
1967: (52): Harihar Bahinipati (PSP)
1961: (91): Bhagwan Pratihari (Congress)
1957: (63): Harihar Bahinipati (PSP)
1951: (86): Fakir Charan Das (Socialist Party)

2019 election result

2014 election result
In the 2014 election, Biju Janata Dal candidate Maheswar Mohanty defeated Congress Party candidate Uma Ballav Rath by a margin of 34,721 votes.

2009 election result
In the 2009 election, Biju Janata Dal candidate Maheswar Mohanty defeated Bharatiya Janata Party candidate Uma Ballav Rath by a margin of 13,394 votes.

Notes

References

Assembly constituencies of Odisha
Puri district